Martin of Tours (316/336 – 8 November 397), also known as Martin the Merciful, was the third bishop of Tours. He has become one of the most familiar and recognizable Christian saints in France, heralded as the patron saint of the Third Republic, and is patron saint of many communities and organizations across Europe. A native of Pannonia (in central Europe), he converted to Christianity at a young age. He served in the Roman cavalry in Gaul, but left military service at some point prior to 361, when he became a disciple of Hilary of Poitiers, establishing the monastery at Ligugé. He was consecrated as Bishop of Caesarodunum (Tours) in 371. As bishop, he was active in the suppression of the remnants of Gallo-Roman religion, but he opposed the violent persecution of the Priscillianist sect of ascetics.

His life was recorded by a contemporary hagiographer, Sulpicius Severus. Some of the accounts of his travels may have been interpolated into his vita to validate early sites of his cult.  He is best known for the account of his using his sword to cut his cloak in two, to give half to a beggar clad only in rags in the depth of winter. His shrine in Tours became a famous stopping-point for pilgrims on the road to Santiago de Compostela in Spain. His cult was revived in French nationalism during the Franco-Prussian War of 1870/1, and as a consequence he was seen as a patron saint of France during the French Third Republic.

Hagiography
The early life of Martin was written by Sulpicius Severus, a contemporary Christian writer, who knew him personally. This biography expresses, among other things, the immediacy the 4th-century Christian felt with the Devil in all his disguises, and has some accounts of miracles. Some follow familiar conventions— casting out devils, raising the paralytic and the dead. 
Sulpicius Severus recounts in which manner St Martin raised a dead man as follows:

Others are: turning back the flames from a house while Martin was burning down the Roman temple it adjoined; deflecting the path of a felled sacred pine; the healing power of a letter written from Martin.

Life

Soldier
Martin was born in AD 316 or 336 in Savaria in the  Diocese of Pannonia (now Szombathely, Hungary). His father was a senior officer (tribune) in the Roman army. A few years after Martin's birth, his father was given veteran status and was allocated land on which to retire at Ticinum (now Pavia), in northern Italy, where Martin grew up.

At the age of 10 he attended the Christian church against the wishes of his parents and became a catechumen. Christianity had been made a legal religion (in 313) in the Roman Empire. It had many more adherents in the Eastern Empire, whence it had sprung, and was concentrated in cities, brought along the trade routes by converted Jews and Greeks (the term 'pagan' literally means 'country-dweller'). Christianity was far from accepted among the higher echelons of society; among members of the army the worship of Mithras would have been stronger. Although the conversion of the Emperor Constantine and the subsequent programme of church-building gave a greater impetus to the spread of the religion, it was still a minority faith.

As the son of a veteran officer, Martin at 15 was required to join a cavalry ala. At the age of 18 (around 334 or 354), he was stationed at Ambianensium civitas or Samarobriva in Gaul (now Amiens, France). It is likely that he joined the Equites catafractarii Ambianenses, a heavy cavalry unit listed in the Notitia Dignitatum. As the unit was stationed at Milan and is also recorded at Trier, it is likely to have been part of the elite cavalry bodyguard of the Emperor, which accompanied him on his travels around the Empire. 

Martin's biographer, Sulpicius Severus, provided no dates in his chronology, so although he indicated that Martin served in the military "for nearly two years after his baptism," it is difficult for the historian to pin down the exact date of Martin's exit from military service. Still, historian Andre Mertens has provided this guidance: "He [Martin] served under the Roman emperor Constantine II (ruled 337-61) and afterwards under Julian (ruled 355-60)."

Regardless of the difficulties in chronology, Sulpicius reports that just before a battle in the Gallic provinces at Borbetomagus (now Worms, Germany), Martin determined that his switch of allegiance to a new commanding officer (away from antichristian Julian and to Christ), along with reluctance to receive Julian's pay just as Martin was retiring, prohibited his taking the money and continuing to submit to the authority of the former now, telling him, "I am the soldier of Christ: it is not lawful for me to fight." He was charged with cowardice and jailed, but in response to the charge, he volunteered to go unarmed to the front of the troops. His superiors planned to take him up on the offer, but before they could, the invaders sued for peace, the battle never occurred, and Martin was released from military service.

Monk and hermit
Martin declared his vocation, and made his way to the city of Caesarodunum (now Tours), where he became a disciple of Hilary of Poitiers' Christian orthodoxy. He opposed the Arianism of the Imperial Court. When Hilary was forced into exile from Pictavium (now Poitiers), Martin returned to Italy. According to Sulpicius, he converted an Alpine brigand on the way, and confronted the Devil himself. Having heard in a dream a summons to revisit his home, Martin crossed the Alps, and from Milan went over to Pannonia. There he converted his mother and some other persons; his father he could not win over. While in Illyricum he took sides against the Arians with so much zeal that he was publicly whipped and forced to leave. Returning from Illyria, he was confronted by Auxentius, the Arian Archbishop of Milan, who expelled him from the city. According to the early sources, Martin decided to seek shelter on the island then called Gallinaria, now Isola d'Albenga, in the Ligurian Sea, where he lived the solitary life of a hermit. Not entirely alone, since the chronicles indicate that he would have been in the company of a priest, a man of great virtues, and for a period with Hilary of Poitiers, on this island, where the wild hens lived. Martin lived on a diet of herbs and wild roots. It is alleged he ate hellebore, a plant that he did not know was poisonous. A legend tells that being on the verge of death for having eaten this herb, he prayed and was miraculously cured.

With the return of Hilary to his see in 361, Martin joined him and established a hermitage nearby, which soon attracted converts and followers. The crypt under the parish church (not the current Abbey Chapel) reveals traces of a Roman villa, probably part of the bath complex, which had been abandoned before Martin established himself there. This site was developed into the Benedictine Ligugé Abbey, the oldest monastery known in Europe. It became a centre for the evangelisation of the country districts. Martin travelled and preached through western Gaul: "The memory of these apostolic journeyings survives to our day in the numerous local legends of which Martin is the hero and which indicate roughly the routes that he followed."

Bishop
In AD 371 Martin was acclaimed bishop of Tours, where he impressed the city with his demeanour. He had been drawn to Tours by a ruse — he was urged to come to minister to someone sick — and was brought to the church, where he reluctantly allowed himself to be consecrated bishop. According to one version, he was so unwilling to be made bishop that he hid in a barn full of geese, but their cackling at his intrusion gave him away to the crowd; that may account for complaints by a few that his appearance was too disheveled to be commensurate with a bishopric, but the critics were hugely outnumbered.

As bishop, Martin set to enthusiastically ordering the destruction of pagan temples, altars and sculptures:

Sulpicius affirms that Martin withdrew from the city to live in Marmoutier (Majus Monasterium), the monastery he founded, which faces Tours from the opposite shore of the river Loire. Recent excavations under the abbey church have revealed the traces of a Roman posting station, beside the main Roman road along the north bank of the Loire, which seems to have been the original dwelling for the community; the "caves" on the site are post-Roman and are probably the result of quarrying the coteau for the Romanesque abbey buildings.
"Here Martin and some of the monks who followed him built cells of wood; others lived in caves dug out of the rock." (Sulpicius Severus).

Martin introduced a rudimentary parish system. Once a year, the bishop visited each of his parishes, traveling on foot, or by donkey or boat. He continued to set up monastic communities, and extended the bounds of his episcopate from Touraine to such distant points as Chartres, Paris, Autun, and Vienne.

In one instance, the  pagans agreed to fell their sacred pine tree, if Martin would stand directly in its path. He did so, and it miraculously missed him. Sulpicius, a classically educated aristocrat, related this anecdote with dramatic details, as a set piece. Sulpicius could not have failed to know the incident the Roman poet Horace recalls in several Odes of his own narrow escape from a falling tree.

Martin was so dedicated to the freeing of prisoners that when authorities, even emperors, heard he was coming, they refused to see him because they knew he would request mercy for someone and they would be unable to refuse.

On behalf of the Priscillianists
The churches of other parts of Gaul and in Spain were being disturbed by the Priscillianists, an ascetic sect, named after its leader, Priscillian. The First Council of Saragossa had forbidden several of Priscillian's practices (albeit without mentioning Priscillian by name), but Priscillian was elected bishop of Avila shortly thereafter. Ithacius of Ossonoba appealed to the emperor Gratian, who issued a rescript against Priscillian and his followers. After failing to obtain the support of Ambrose of Milan and Pope Damasus I, Priscillian appealed to Magnus Maximus, who had usurped the throne from Gratian.

Although greatly opposed to the Priscillianists, Martin traveled to the Imperial court of Trier to remove them from the secular jurisdiction of the emperor. With Ambrose, Martin rejected Bishop Ithacius's principle of putting heretics to death—as well as the intrusion of the emperor into such matters. He prevailed upon the emperor to spare the life of the heretic Priscillian. At first, Maximus acceded to his entreaty, but, when Martin had departed, yielded to Ithacius and ordered Priscillian and his followers to be beheaded (in 385). Martin then pleaded for a cessation of the persecution of Priscillian's followers in Spain. Deeply grieved, Martin refused to communicate with Ithacius, until pressured by the Emperor.

Martin died in Candes-Saint-Martin, Gaul (central France) in 397.  After he died, local citizens of the Poitou region and residents of Tours quarreled over where Martin would be buried. One evening after dark, several residents of Tours carried Martin's body to a waiting boat on the river Loire, where teams of rowers ferried his body on the river to Tours, where a huge throng of people waited on the river banks to meet and pay their last respects to Martin's body.  One chronicle states that “2,000 monks, and nearly as many white-robed virgins, walked in the procession” accompanying the body from the river to a small grove outside of Tours, where Martin was buried.

Abbey of Marmoutier

The Abbey of Marmoutier was a monastery just outside today's city of Tours in Indre-et-Loire, France established by Martin around 372. Martin founded the monastery to escape attention and live life as a monastic. The Abbey at Tours was one of the most prominent and influential establishments in medieval France. Charlemagne awarded the position of Abbot to his friend and adviser Alcuin. 
At this time the abbot could travel between Tours and the court at Trier in Germany and always stay overnight at one of his own properties. It was at Tours that Alcuin's scriptorium (a room in monasteries devoted to the copying of manuscripts by monastic scribes) developed Caroline minuscule, the clear round hand that made manuscripts far more legible.

In later times the abbey was destroyed by fire on several occasions and ransacked by Norman Vikings in 853 and in 903. It burned again in 994, and was rebuilt by Hervé de Buzançais, treasurer of Saint Martin, an effort that took 20 years to complete. Expanded to accommodate the crowds of pilgrims and to attract them, the shrine of St. Martin of Tours became a major stopping-point on pilgrimages. In 1453 the remains of Saint Martin were transferred to a magnificent new reliquary donated by Charles VII of France and Agnes Sorel.

During the French Wars of Religion, the basilica was sacked by the Protestant Huguenots in 1562. It was disestablished during the French Revolution. It was deconsecrated, used as a stable, then utterly demolished. Its dressed stones were sold in 1802 after two streets were built across the site, to ensure the abbey would not be reconstructed.

Legend of Saint Martin Dividing his Cloak

While Martin was a soldier in the Roman army and stationed in Gaul (modern-day France), he experienced a vision, which became the most-repeated story about his life. One day as he was approaching the gates of the city of Amiens, he met a scantily clad beggar. He impulsively cut his military cloak in half to share with the man. That night, Martin dreamed of Jesus wearing the half-cloak he had given away. He heard Jesus say to the angels: "Martin, who is still but a catechumen, clothed me with this robe." (Sulpicius, ch 2). In another version, when Martin woke, he found his cloak restored to wholeness. The dream confirmed Martin in his piety, and he was baptised at the age of 18.

The part kept by himself became the famous relic preserved in the oratory of the Merovingian kings of the Franks at the Marmoutier Abbey near Tours. During the Middle Ages, the supposed relic of St. Martin's miraculous cloak (cappa Sancti Martini) was carried by the king even into battle, and used as a holy relic upon which oaths were sworn. The cloak is first attested to in the royal treasury in 679, when it was conserved at the palatium of Luzarches, a royal villa that was later ceded to the monks of Saint-Denis by Charlemagne, in 798/99.

The priest who cared for the cloak in its reliquary was called a cappellanu, and ultimately all priests who served the military were called cappellani. The French translation is chapelains, from which the English word chaplain is derived.

A similar linguistic development took place for the term referring to the small temporary churches built for the relic. People called them a "capella", the word for a little cloak. Eventually, such small churches lost their association with the cloak, and all small churches began to be referred to as "chapels".

Veneration

The veneration of Martin was widely popular in the Middle Ages, above all in the region between the Loire and the Marne, where Le Roy Ladurie and Zysberg noted the densest accretion of place names commemorating Martin. Venantius Fortunatus had earlier declared, "Wherever Christ is known, Martin is honored."

When Bishop Perpetuus took office at Tours in 461, the little chapel over Martin's grave, built in the previous century by Martin's immediate successor, Bricius, was no longer sufficient for the crowd of pilgrims it was already drawing. Martin's body was taken from the simple chapel at his hermitage at Candes-St-Martin to Tours and his sarcophagus was reburied behind the high altar of the new basilica. A large block of marble above the tomb, the gift of bishop Euphronius of Autun (472–475), rendered it visible to the faithful gathered behind the high altar. Werner Jacobsen suggests it may also have been visible to pilgrims encamped in the atrium of the basilica. Contrary to the usual arrangement, the atrium was situated behind the church, close to the tomb in the apse, which may have been visible through a fenestrella in the apse wall.

St. Martin's popularity can be partially attributed to his adoption by successive royal houses of France. Clovis, King of the Salian Franks, one of many warring tribes in sixth-century France, promised his Christian wife Clotilda that he would be baptised if he was victorious over the Alemanni. He credited the intervention of St Martin with his success, and with several following triumphs, including the defeat of Alaric II. The popular devotion to St Martin continued to be closely identified with the Merovingian monarchy: in the early seventh century Dagobert I commissioned the goldsmith Saint Eligius to make a work in gold and gems for the tomb-shrine. The bishop Gregory of Tours wrote and distributed an influential Life filled with miraculous events of St. Martin's career. Martin's cultus survived the passage of power to the Merovingians' successors, the Carolingian dynasty.

Martin is honored in the Church of England and in the Episcopal Church on 11 November.

Revival of the popular devotion to St. Martin in the Third Republic

Excavations and rediscovery of the tomb

In 1860 excavations by Leo Dupont (1797–1876) established the dimensions of the former abbey and recovered some fragments of architecture. The tomb of St. Martin was rediscovered on 14 December 1860, which aided in the nineteenth-century revival of the popular devotion to St. Martin.

After the radical Paris Commune of 1871, there was a resurgence of conservative Catholic piety, and the church decided to build a basilica to St. Martin. They selected Victor Laloux as architect. He eschewed Gothic for a mix of Romanesque and Byzantine, sometimes defined as neo-Byzantine. The new Basilique Saint-Martin was erected on a portion of its former site, which was purchased from the owners. Started in 1886, the church was consecrated 4 July 1925.

Franco-Prussian War
Martin's renewed popularity in France was related to his promotion as a military saint during the Franco-Prussian War of 1870–1871.  
During the military and political crisis of the Franco-Prussian war, Napoleon III's Second Empire collapsed. After the surrender of Napoleon to the Prussians after the Battle of Sedan in September 1870, a provisional government of national defense was established, and France's Third Republic was proclaimed. Paris was evacuated due to the advancing enemy and for a brief time (September–December 1870), Tours became the effective capital of France.

St Martin was promoted by the clerical right as the protector of the nation against the German threat. Conservatives associated the dramatic collapse of Napoleon III's regime as a sign of divine retribution on the irreligious emperor.  Priests interpreted it as punishment for a nation led astray due to years of anti-clericalism.  They preached repentance and a return to religion for political stability.  The ruined towers of the old royal basilica of St. Martin at Tours came to symbolize the decline of traditional Catholic France.

With the government's relocation to Tours during the Franco-Prussian War, 1870, numerous pilgrims were attracted to St. Martin's tomb. It was covered by a temporary chapel built by  archbishop Guibert.  The popular devotion to St. Martin was also associated with the nationalistic devotion to the Sacred Heart.  The flag of Sacre-Coeur, borne by Ultramontane Catholic Pontifical Zouaves who fought at Patay, had been placed overnight in St. Martin's tomb before being taken into battle on 9 October 1870.  The banner read "Heart of Jesus Save France" and on the reverse side Carmelite nuns of Tours embroidered "Saint Martin Protect France".As the French army was victorious in Patay, many among the faithful took the victory to be the result of divine favor. Popular hymns of the 1870s developed the theme of national protection under the cover of Martin's cloak, the "first flag of France".

During the nineteenth-century Frenchmen, influenced by secularism, agnosticism, and anti-clericalism, deserted the church in great numbers. As Martin was a man's saint, the devotion to him was an exception to this trend.  For men serving in the military, Martin of Tours was presented by the Catholic Right as the masculine model of principled behavior. He was a brave fighter, knew his obligation to the poor, shared his goods, performed his required military service, followed legitimate orders, and respected secular authority.

Opposition from Anticlericals
During the 1870s, the procession to St. Martin's tomb at Tours became a display of ecclesiastical and military cooperation. Army officers in full uniform acted as military escorts, symbolically protecting the clergy and clearing the path for them. Anti-clerics viewed the staging of public religious processions as a violation of civic space. In 1878, M. Rivière, the provisional mayor of Tours, with anticlerical support banned the November procession in honor of St. Martin. President Patrice de Mac-Mahon was succeeded by the Republican Jules Grévy, who created a new national anticlerical offensive. Bishop Louis-Édouard-François-Desiré Pie of Poitiers united conservatives and devised a massive demonstration for the November 1879 procession. Pie's ultimate hope was that St Martin would stop the “chariot” of modern society, and lead to the creation of a France where the religious and secular sectors merged.

The struggle between the two men was reflective of that between conservatives and anti-clerics over the church's power in the army. From 1874, military chaplains were allowed in the army in times of peace, but anti-clerics viewed the chaplains as sinister monarchists and counter-revolutionaries. Conservatives responded by creating the short-lived Legion de Saint Maurice in 1878 and the society, Notre Dame de Soldats, to provide unpaid voluntary chaplains with financial support. The legislature passed the anticlerical Duvaux Bill of 1880, which reduced the number of chaplains in the French army. Anticlerical legislators wanted commanders, not chaplains, to provide troops with moral support and to supervise their formation in the established faith of "patriotic Republicanism."

St. Martin as a French Republican patron
St. Martin has long been associated with France's royal heritage. Monsignor René François Renou (Archbishop of Tours, 1896–1913) worked to associate St. Martin as a specifically "republican" patron. Renou had served as a chaplain to the 88e Régiment des mobils d'Indre-et-Loire  during the Franco-Prussian war and was known as the "army bishop." Renou was a strong supporter of St. Martin and believed that the national destiny of France and all its victories were attributed to him. He linked the military to the cloak of St. Martin, which was the "first flag of France" to the French tricolor, "the symbol of the union of the old and new."  This flag symbolism connected the devotion to St. Martin with the Third Republic. But, the tensions of the Dreyfus Affair renewed anti-clericalism in France and drove a wedge between the Church and the Republic. By 1905, the influence of Rene Waldeck-Rousseau and Emile Combes, combined with deteriorating relations with the Vatican, led to the separation of church and state.

St. Martin's popularity was renewed during the First World War. Anticlericalism declined, and priests served in the French forces as chaplains. More than 5,000 of them died in the war. In 1916, Assumptionists organized a national pilgrimage to Tours that attracted people from all of France. The devotion to St. Martin was amplified in the dioceses of France, where special prayers were offered to the patron saint. When the armistice was signed on Saint Martin's Day, 11 November 1918, the French people saw it was a sign of his intercession in the affairs of France.

Patronage

He is the patron saint of beggars (because of his sharing his cloak), wool-weavers and tailors (also because of his cloak), he is also the patron saint of the US Army Quartermaster Corps even though he detested violence (also because of sharing his cloak), geese (some say because they gave his hiding place away when he tried to avoid being chosen as bishop, others because their migration coincides with his feast), vintners and innkeepers (because his feast falls just after the late grape harvest), and France. He was proclaimed patron of Italian volunteering by the Italian bishops in the spring of 2021.

Beyond his patronage of the French Third Republic, Saint Martin more recently has also been  described in terms of "a spiritual bridge across Europe"  due to his "international" background, being a native of Pannonia who spent his adult life in Gaul.

Iconography
Martin is most generally portrayed on horseback dividing his cloak with the beggar. His emblem in English art is often that of a goose, whose annual migration is about late autumn.

Hammer of Martin of Tours

	 
The Museum Catharijneconvent in Utrecht has a relic in its collection which is called "the hammer of St. Martin of Tours" (Latin: maleus beati Martini). It was made in the 13th or 14th century from a late Bronze Age stone axe from c. 1,000 – 700 BC, though the dating is uncertain. The grip contains a Latin text saying "Ydola vanurunt Martini cesa securi nemo deos credat qui sic fuerant ruicuri" ("the pagan statues fall down, hit by St. Martin's axe. Let nobody believe that those are gods, who so easily fall down"). Legend says that the axe belonged to St. Martin, and was used to hit the devil and to destroy the heathen temples and statues.

Influence

By the early 9th century, respect for Saint Martin was well-established in Ireland. His monastery at Marmoûtiers became the training ground for many Celtic missions and missionaries. Some believe that St. Patrick was his nephew and that Patrick was one of many Celtic notables who lived for a time at Marmoûtiers. St. Ninian definitely studied at Marmoûtiers and was profoundly influenced by Martin, carrying a deep love and respect for his teacher and his methods back to Scotland. Ninian was in the process of building a church when news reached him of Martin's death. Ninian dedicated that church to Martin.
The Book of Armagh contains three distinct groups of material: (1) a complete text of the New Testament, (2) a dossier of materials on Saint Patrick, and (3) almost the complete body of writings on Saint Martin by Sulpicius Severus.

In Jonas of Bobbio's Vita Columbani, Jonas relates that Saint Columbanus, while travelling, requested to be allowed to pray at the tomb of St Martin. The Irish palimpsest sacramentary from the mid-7th century contains the text of a mass for St Martin. In the Life of Columba, Adamnan mentions in passing that St Martin was commemorated during Mass at Iona.

In his Ireland and Her Neighbours in the Seventh Century, Michael Richter attributes this to the mission of Palladius seen within the wider context of the mission of Germanus of Auxerre to Britain around 429. Thus, this could be the context in which the Life of St Martin was brought from Gaul to Ireland at an early date, and could explain how Columbanus was familiar with it before he ever left Ireland.

Legacy

Ligugé Abbey
Founded by Martin of Tours in 360, Ligugé Abbey is one of the earliest monastic foundations in France. The reputation of the founder attracted a large number of disciples to the new monastery; the disciples initially living in locaciacum or small huts, this name later evolved to Ligugé. Its reputation was soon eclipsed by Martin's later foundation at Marmoutier. As of 2013, the Benedictine community at Ligugé numbered twenty-five.

European folk traditions

From the late 4th century to the late Middle Ages, much of Western Europe, including Great Britain, engaged in a period of fasting beginning on the day after St. Martin's Day, November 11. This fast period lasted 40 days (not including Saturdays and Sundays), and was, therefore, called Quadragesima Sancti Martini, which means in Latin "the forty days of St. Martin". At St. Martin's eve and on the feast day, people ate and drank very heartily for a last time before they started to fast. This fasting time was later called "Advent" by the Church and was considered a time for spiritual preparation for Christmas.

On St. Martin's Day, children in Flanders, the southern and northern parts of the Netherlands, and the Catholic areas of Germany and Austria still participate in paper lantern processions. Often, a man dressed as St. Martin rides on a horse in front of the procession. The children sing songs about St. Martin and about their lanterns. The food traditionally eaten on the day is goose, a rich bird. According to legend, Martin was reluctant to become bishop, which is why he hid in a stable filled with geese. The noise made by the geese betrayed his location to the people who were looking for him.

In the eastern part of the Belgian province of East Flanders (Aalst) and the western part of West Flanders (Ypres), traditionally children receive presents from St. Martin on November 11, instead of from Saint Nicholas on December 6 or Santa Claus on December 25. They also have lantern processions, for which children make lanterns out of beets. In recent years, the lantern processions have become widespread as a popular ritual, even in Protestant areas of Germany and the Netherlands. Most Protestant churches no longer officially recognize Saints.

In Portugal, where the saint's day is celebrated across the country, it is common for families and friends to gather around the fire in reunions called magustos, where they typically eat roasted chestnuts and drink wine, jeropiga (a drink made of grape must and aguardente) and aguapé (a sort of weak and watered-down wine). According to the most widespread variation of the cloak story, Saint Martin cut off half of his cloak in order to offer it to a beggar and along the way, he gave the remaining part to a second beggar. As he faced a long ride in a freezing weather, the dark clouds cleared away and the sun shone so intensely that the frost melted away. Such weather was rare for early November, so was credited to God's intervention. The phenomenon of a sunny break to the chilly weather on Saint Martin's Day (11 November) is called Verão de São Martinho (Saint Martin's Summer, veranillo de san Martín in Spanish) in honor of the cloak legend.

In Malta on the night of the eve of Saint Martin's day children leave an empty bag next to the bed. This bag is found full of fruit on the next day.

Many churches are named after Saint Martin of Tours. St Martin-in-the-fields, at Trafalgar Square in the centre of London, has a history appropriately associated with Martin's renunciation of war; Dick Sheppard, founder of the Peace Pledge Union, was Vicar 1914–26, and there is a memorial chapel for him, with a plaque for Vera Brittain, also a noted Anglican pacifist; the steps of the church are often used for peace vigils. Saint Martin's Cathedral, in Ypres, Belgium, is dedicated to him. St. Martin is the patron saint of Szombathely, Hungary, with a church dedicated to him, and also the patron saint of Buenos Aires. In the Netherlands, he is the patron of the cathedral and city of Utrecht. He is the patron of the city of Groningen; its Martini tower and Martinikerk (Groningen) (Martin's Church) were named for him.

He is also the patron of the church and town of Bocaue.

St. Martin's Church in Kaiserslautern, Germany is a major city landmark. It is located in the heart of the city's downtown in St. Martin's Square, and is surrounded by a number of restaurants and shops. The church was originally built as a Franciscan monastery in the 14th century and has a number of unique architectural features.

St. Martin is the patron saint of the Polish towns of Bydgoszcz and Opatów. His day is celebrated with a procession and festivities in the city of Poznań, where the  main street (Święty Marcin) is named for him, after a 13th-century church in his honor. A special type of crescent cake (rogal świętomarciński) is baked for the occasion. As November 11 is also Polish Independence Day, it is a public holiday.

The Monastery of Saint Martin of Castañeda has been a national historic monument since 1931. It is located in Galende, Sanabria, province of Zamora, Spain. It now functions as an interpretation center.

In Latin America, St. Martin has a strong popular following and is frequently referred to as San Martín Caballero, in reference to his common depiction on horseback. Mexican folklore believes him to be a particularly helpful saint toward business owners.

The largest Anglican church in North America is St Martin's Episcopal in Houston, Texas. It was the home church for many years of President and Mrs. George H. W. Bush and still is for former Secretary of State and Treasury James Baker and his wife Susan.

San Martín de Loba is the name of a municipality in the Bolívar Department of Colombia. Saint Martin, as San Martín de Loba, is the patron saint of Vasquez, a small village in Colombia.

In Finland, the town and municipality Marttila (S:t Mårtens in Swedish) is named after St. Martin and depicts him on its coat of arms.

Though no mention of St. Martin's connection with viticulture is made by Gregory of Tours or other early hagiographers, he is now credited with a prominent role in spreading wine-making throughout the Touraine region and the planting of many vines. The Greek myth that Aristaeus first discovered the concept of pruning the vines, after watching a goat eat some of the foliage, has been adopted for Martin. He is also credited with introducing the Chenin blanc grape varietal, from which most of the white wine of western Touraine and Anjou is made.

Martin Luther was named after St. Martin, as he was baptised on November 11 (St. Martin's Day), 1483. Many older Lutheran congregations are named after St. Martin, which is unusual (for Lutherans) because he is a saint who does not appear in the Bible. (Lutherans regularly name congregations after the evangelists and other saints who appear in the Bible but are hesitant to name congregations after post-Biblical saints.)

Martin of Tours is the patron saint of the U.S. Army Quartermaster Corps, which has a medal in his name. The Church Lads' and Church Girls' Brigade, a 5–7 age group, was renamed 'Martins' in his honour in 1998.

Many schools have St Martin as their Patron, one being St. Martin's School (Rosettenville) in Johannesburg.

In art and modern film
The Dutch film Flesh and Blood (1985) prominently features a statue of Saint Martin. A mercenary in Renaissance Italy, named Martin, finds a statue of Saint Martin cutting his cloak and takes it as a sign to desert and rogue around under the saint's protection.

Bay 20 in the Chartres Cathedral portrays the life of St. Martin in a 40-panel stained glass window.

See also
 St. Martin's Day
 The Community of Saint Martin, an association of Roman Catholic priests
 Church of St Martin of Tours (disambiguation)
 Martin (name)
 Saint Martin of Tours, patron saint archive

References

Explanatory notes

Citations

General and cited sources

Further reading 

 
 Boucheron, Patrick, et al., eds. (2019). France in the World: A New Global History. pp. 75–80.
 Maurey, Yossi (2014). Medieval Music, Legend, and the Cult of St Martin: The Local Foundations of a Universal Saint. Cambridge: Cambridge University Press, 2014.

External links

 "St. Martin, Bishop of Tours, Confessor", Butler's Lives of the Saints
 The Life and Miracles of Saint Martin of Tours, Bishop and Confessor of the Catholic Church
 The Community of St Martin
 St Martin's churches of the world 
 
 Joachim Schäfer: 
 Erzbistum Köln: 1600 Jahre Verehrung des heiligen Martin von Tours
 Martin from a historian's viewpoint (German)
 Saint Martin Churches around the world
 Martin von Tours: Soldat, Eremit und Heiliger, film clips by Rüdiger Achenbach in the series Tag für Tag on Deutschlandfunk, Part 1 on 6 November 2014 and Part 2 on 7 November 2014

316 births
397 deaths
4th-century apocalypticists
4th-century archbishops
4th-century Christian saints
4th-century bishops in Gaul
Anglican saints
Bishops of Tours
Burials in Centre-Val de Loire
Conscientious objectors
Dutch folklore
Gallo-Roman saints
Patron saints of France
Romans from Pannonia